Events from the year 1732 in Ireland.

Incumbent
Monarch: George II

Events
March 8 – report of a House of Lords committee on the 'state of popery'.
March 10 – act reduces the interest rate on loans to 6%.
Conor Begley and Hugh MacCartin's English-Irish dictionary is published in Paris.
Trinity College Library in Dublin, designed by Thomas Burgh, is completed.

Births
May 15 – John Blaquiere, 1st Baron de Blaquiere, soldier and politician (d. 1812)
November 25 – Robert Clements, 1st Earl of Leitrim, politician (d. 1804)
Full date unknown – Henry Flood, statesman (d. 1791)

Deaths
July 3 (buried) – Mary Davys, novelist, poet and playwright (b. 1674)
July 7 – John Sale, lawyer and MP (b. circa 1675)
December 2 – Constantia Grierson, editor, poet and classical scholar (b. 1705)

References

 
Years of the 18th century in Ireland
Ireland
1730s in Ireland